Motamarri is a village in Khammam district of the Indian state of Telangana. It is located in Bonakal mandal, on the bank of the Wyra River.

Villages in Khammam district